Big Sandy Creek is a  tributary of the Sabine River in Franklin, Wood and Upshur counties in northeastern Texas.

See also
List of rivers of Texas

References

USGS Hydrologic Unit Map - State of Texas (1974)

Rivers of Texas
Rivers of Franklin County, Texas
Rivers of Wood County, Texas
Rivers of Upshur County, Texas